Shawangunk is a town in southwestern Ulster County, New York, United States. The population was 13,563 at the 2020 census. The town takes its name from its largest stream, the Shawangunk Kill. The name Shawangunk is from the language of the Lenape people. Kill is an abbreviation of the Dutch word for creek, Killitje. It is pronounced Shuh-Whan-Gung

History
Shawangunk was first settled by Europeans during the 1680s.  The region was first designated a precinct about 1710, and became the township of Shawangunk in 1788.  The town's name comes from the Dutch transliteration of the Munsee Lenape name or phrase. The approximate Lenape pronunciation was "Sha-WAN-gunk,"  probably meaning "in the smoky air."  The name first appears in the 1682 Indian deed to Gertrude Bruyn. It is uncertain if this was the Indians' actual proper name for their nearby village and "New Fort," destroyed by the Dutch on Sept 5, 1663 during the Second Esopus War, or if the name was merely a phrase invented by the Indians in connection with the Bruyn land purchase, possibly describing some temporary feature of the landscape. Suggestions as to whether the name may have referred to smoky conditions on the day of Bruyn's first tour of the land with the Indians in the 1670s, or to the smoky ruins of the destroyed Indian village during the preceding decade, are purely speculative. Use of the name to designate the creek on which Bruyn settled (Shawangunk Kill), and the mountain range, came somewhat later. Locals pronounce the name "SHONG-gum," an obvious corruption or contraction of the original name, but one on record at least as far back as 1777 (Marc B. Fried, "Shawangunk Place-names" pp. ix-xi, 3-12, 96-97). Present-day citizens of Shawangunk often refer to themselves as living in particular hamlets such as Wallkill or Walker Valley rather than the town as a whole; this is due to the fact that many residents of the western part of the town are in the school district of Pine Bush (nearby across the county line) and have Pine Bush mailing addresses, also doing much of their shopping in that Orange County hamlet.

Geography

The southern town line and half of the eastern town boundary is the border of Orange County, New York.

The northeastward-flowing Wallkill River passes through the eastern half of town and lends its name to the hamlet, which lies along its east bank. The western part of the town, including Walker Valley, climbs the lower slopes of the eponymous mountains. The Shawangunk Kill, a major tributary of the Wallkill, divides the town approximately in half.

Government
The town of Shawangunk is led by a supervisor and a board of four council members. The current supervisor is John Valk, Jr., in office since 1998.

List of supervisors of Shawangunk:

Demographics

As of 2009, there were 12,652 people, 4,333 households, and 2,557 families residing in the town.  The population density was 225 people per square mile .  There were 3,754 housing units at an average density of 66.8 per square mile (25.8/km2). The racial makeup of the town was 83% White, 7.9% African American, .2% Native American, .9% Asian, .01% Pacific Islander, 2.86% from other races, and 1.32% from two or more races. Hispanic or Latino of any race were 6.96% of the population.

There were 3,433 households, out of which 39.2% had children under the age of 18 living with them, 61.5% were married couples living together, 8.4% had a female householder with no husband present, and 25.5% were non-families. 20.2% of all households were made up of individuals, and 7% had someone living alone who was 65 years of age or older.  The average household size was 2.78 and the average family size was 3.21.

In the town, the population was spread out, with 22.4% under the age of 18, 8.5% from 18 to 24, 38.3% from 25 to 44, 22.2% from 45 to 64, and 8.7% who were 65 years of age or older.  The median age was 36 years. For every 100 females, there were 134.3 males.  For every 100 females age 18 and over, there were 144.3 males.

The median income for a household in the town was $52,366, and the median income for a family was $59,975. Males had a median income of $40,967 versus $29,608 for females. The per capita income for the town was $19,402.  About 4.4% of families and 13.4% of the population were below the poverty line, including 7.0% of those under age 18 and 10.5% of those age 65 or over.

Housing
Statistics about housing in the town:
Total: 4,333
Occupied: 3,877
Owner-occupied: 3,092
Population in owner-occupied: 8,890
Renter-occupied: 795
Population in renter-occupied: 1,917
Households with individuals under 18: 1,465
Vacant: 446
Vacant for rent: 87
Vacant for sale: 66

Geology 
The Shawangunk Mountains, primarily consisting of quartz, rise 2,000 feet above the town. The mountains were created over 10,000 years ago during the last ice age when retreating glacial ice carved them out as part the surrounding Catskills, drawing tourists and climbing enthusiasts from all over the world.

Communities and locations in Shawangunk 
Awosting – A hamlet in the northwestern part of the town.
Bruynswick – A hamlet near the northern town line on County Route 7.
Crawford – A hamlet in the northwestern section of the town, south of Awosting.
Dwaarkill – A hamlet north of Red Mills, located on County Route 7.
Galeville – A former hamlet in the eastern part of the town, north of Wallkill.  Galeville is on the west bank of the Wallkill River. Once home to Galeville Army Air Base, now Shawangunk Grasslands National Wildlife Refuge.
New Hurley – A former hamlet on Route 208.
Red Mills – A hamlet at the southern town line and north of Pine Bush.
Rutsonville'
Shawangunk Kill – A small stream in the town.
Ulsterville – Aest of Pine Bush, located on County Road 7.
Watchtower – A census-designated-place (CDP) that is entirely made up of the residents of Watchtower Farms, a printing facility that draws tens of thousands of visitors every year. It is owned and operated by the Watchtower Society (a legal entity of Jehovah's Witnesses) and has been in operation since 1963.
Walker Valley – a hamlet in the southwest part of the town on Route 52.  Walker Valley is west of Pine Bush.
Wallkill – a hamlet at the eastern town line.
Shawangunk Correctional Facility – a New York state prison, north of Wallkill.
Wallkill Correctional Facility – a state prison north of Wallkill.

References

External links

 Town website
  Shawangunk Kill

 
Shawangunks
Wallkill River
Towns in Ulster County, New York
Populated places established in 1670
1670 establishments in the Province of New York
Towns in the New York metropolitan area